N-acetyl-beta-glucosaminyl-glycoprotein 4-beta-N-acetylgalactosaminyltransferase (beta1,4-N-acetylgalactosaminyltransferase III, beta4GalNAc-T3, beta1,4-N-acetylgalactosaminyltransferase IV, beta4GalNAc-T4, UDP-N-acetyl-D-galactosamine:N-acetyl-D-glucosaminyl-group beta-1,4-N-acetylgalactosaminyltransferase) is an enzyme with systematic name UDP-N-acetyl-D-galactosamine:N-acetyl-beta-D-glucosaminyl-group 4-beta-N-acetylgalactosaminyltransferase. This enzyme catalyses the following chemical reaction

 UDP-N-acetyl-D-galactosamine + N-acetyl-beta-D-glucosaminyl group  UDP + N-acetyl-beta-D-galactosaminyl-(1->4)-N-acetyl-beta-D-glucosaminyl group

The enzyme from human can transfer N-acetyl-D-galactosamine (GalNAc) to N-glycan and O-glycan substrates that have N-acetyl-D-glucosamine (GlcNAc).

References

External links 
 

EC 2.4.1